Mãn Đức is a town and the capital of the Tân Lạc District of Hòa Bình Province, in the northwestern region of Vietnam.

References

Populated places in Hòa Bình province